Cathy Jolly (born September 8, 1972) is an American attorney and politician who served as a member of the Missouri House of Representatives from 2001 to 2007.

Background 
Born in St. Louis, Missouri, she attended the University of Missouri and the University of Missouri–Kansas City School of Law. She has worked as an attorney and as the assistant prosecuting attorney for Jackson County, Missouri.

References

1972 births
Living people
20th-century American politicians
21st-century American politicians
20th-century American women politicians
21st-century American women politicians
Democratic Party members of the Missouri House of Representatives
Women state legislators in Missouri
University of Missouri alumni